The Church is a 1989 Italian supernatural horror film co-written and directed by Michele Soavi, and produced by Dario Argento with Mario Cecchi Gori and Vittorio Cecchi Gori. It stars Hugh Quarshie, Tomas Arana, Barbara Cupisti, Asia Argento, Feodor Chaliapin, Jr. and Giovanni Lombardo Radice.

The Church was originally conceived as the third installment in the Dèmoni series, following Demons (1985) and Demons 2 (1986). Soavi insisted the film to be distant from the series, wanting it to be "sophisticated", and re-wrote the screenplay to remove any connection to the series. Filming was primarily shot in the Matthias Church in Budapest, with additional footage filmed at studio sets in Rome and in downtown Hamburg, Germany.

Plot 
In medieval Germany, a band of Teutonic Knights massacre a village of supposed devil-worshippers and bury their bodies underground, building a Gothic cathedral over the mass grave as a means to contain the demonic evil within.

In the present day, the cathedral's new librarian Evan arrives for his first day on the job. He meets Lisa, an artist supervising a restoration of the church's elaborate frescoes, who introduces him to the surly Bishop and the kindly Father Gus. The Bishop warns Evan not to enter the church's catacombs, nominally due to their instability.

Lisa begins restoring a fresco in the cellar, when she uncovers a hidden compartment containing a mysterious parchment carrying what resemble architectural schematics. Evan sneaks the parchment out of the church under the suspicious Bishop's nose, and goes home with Lisa. Bonding over a mutual interest in medieval art and architecture, the two start to make love, when Evan has a sudden realization and finds hidden Latin text on the parchment referring to a "stone with seven eyes".

As Evan explores the catacombs to find the stone, Gus and Lisa experience strange, paranormal visions. Meanwhile, the Bishop finds the parchment and begins studying it closely. Searching the cellar, Evan uncovers the stone in a hidden crypt; a seal embedded into the ground above a cross. Evan manages to pry open the seal, revealing a vast, seemingly endless black void. A blue light radiates from the hole and reveals a sack. Evan opens the sack, and is grabbed by hands from the inside before he blacks out. When he regains consciousness, the sack and hands are gone, and his wrists are bleeding. Evan closes the hole and the sacristan enters in search of an intruder. Evan knocks him out and flees, becoming pale and bloody. Losing control of his hands, he tears out his still-beating heart and bites into it.

At home, Lisa experiences dreams of the unsealed hole and a vast, candle-filled atrium. Awake and waiting for Evan's return, she is attacked by a goat-headed demon and flees in terror. Returning home, the sacristan begins experiencing the same symptoms as Evan.

The next day, Lisa goes to Evan's office, where he is acting strangely. He tries to sexually assault her and she flees, shocked and horrified. Evan likewise menaces the sacristan's daughter Lotte, with whom he'd previously been amiable. Evan and the sacristan both become increasingly disheveled and violent. Lotte flees her apartment when she sees her father (who was in the process of abusing Lotte) reflected as an ape-like demon. Having a moment of clarity, the sacristan rushes to the confession booth, and tells Father Gus that he has become demonically possessed and fears losing control. To Gus' horror, he rushes to the cellar and kills himself with a jackhammer, begging for forgiveness before he dies.

His death seemingly triggers security mechanisms that cause the church to seal shut, trapping everyone inside. Among the occupants are a class of schoolchildren on a field trip, a bride taking wedding photographs, an elderly couple, and a argumentative pair of teenage bikers. The occupants begin experiencing increasingly elaborate and deadly visions. The bride sees her reflection rapidly age, and in a fit of madness tears the skin off her own face. One of the schoolchildren sees his friend turn into his doppelganger before being killed. The teenager sees his girlfriend in the embrace of a gargoyle. As the occupants try to find a way out, Gus confronts the aloof Bishop, and discovers him on the rooftop with a stash of occult parchments and schematics for the church. He reveals that he intends to let the evil inside kill the occupants before being unleashed on what he sees as a sinful and corrupt world, before accidentally falling to his death.

Those inside start dying in droves; the teenage couple manage to dig through a thin section of the floor and rappel down beneath the church, only to unknowingly enter a subway tunnel and be struck and killed. The sacristan reanimates as a specter and completely possessed, proceeds to kill the schoolteacher. At a nightclub in town, Lotte senses something wrong and rushes back to the church, using a secret passageway in the aqueduct to get inside. Meanwhile, Lisa enters into a trance and wanders into the cellar, finding herself in the same candlelit atrium of her dreams. Surrounded by the reanimated specters of the church's victims who chant blasphemy, she lies atop an altar and is raped by Evan, now fully transformed into a goat-headed demon.

Searching the Bishop's office, Gus finds the ancient records recounting the church's creation. Lotte enters, and upon sees someone who looks like her in a woodcut depicting the massacre (implied to be her in a past-life). Suddenly flooded with memories from centuries prior, she reveals that the church's architect was left to die in the church he had built, and that his body contains a self-destruct mechanism for the entire building. Gus tells Lotte to flee, and he makes his way through the cellar and to the chapel hall as the dead bodies of the massacre victims buried beneath the church at the beginning of the movie slowly begin to rise. Gus reaches the altar, and finds a massive pile of reanimating corpses rising out from the ground, forming as the head of devil. Before the evil force can be fully set free, Gus finds the architect's mummified body hidden beneath the floor, and activates the self-destruct mechanism. The building collapses, killing everyone inside, including Gus, Lisa and Evan. Only Lotte escapes.

Some time later, Lotte returns to the ruins of the church with flowers. A passing truck uncovers the stone seal and blows it open. As she hears the sounds of horses running, blue light emits from within, just like when Evan first opened it, and she smiles enigmatically.

Cast

Production

In an interview conducted on January 22, 1988, directors Lamberto Bava and Dario Argento were discussing a follow-up to Demons 2 stating that they were working on a follow-up film, with Argento stating it would not be called Demons 3, but potentially Ritorno alla casa dei demoni. The third Demons film had a story developed by Franco Ferrini and Dardano Sacchetti which involved an airplane that had to make an emergency landing where it finds itself on an island with a volcano where the passengers. Sacchetti explained that the situation was for them to arrive in a "weird hell" and compared the film to Alien, but with the isolated place being an airplane opposed to a spaceship and the demons replacing the aliens. After developing several drafts, the writers abandoned the story with Sacchetti stating that they had trouble creating a story set in an isolated area of the airplane. The screenwriters eventually developed a new screenplay set in a church which acted as a passage into hell. Argento would later state that The Church "was never Demons 3, nobody but Lamberto ever wanted to make Demons 3; I didn't want it, the studio didn't want it, nobody wanted it".

The decision of re-starting the screenplay from the beginning led to Bava leaving the project as he began working on a set of television films in October 1988. This led to director Michele Soavi to enter production as the director, right after he had completed his film Stage Fright. Soavi was surprised at Bava leaving the project, stating "I couldn't be he had worked on it for so long and didn't want to complete the project". Soavi made some changes to the script, including a new opening scene influenced by John Milius' film Conan the Barbarian. Soavi declared that he "loved the first part, but in the middle it was a little silly, so I got together with Franco Ferrini and worked on it to make it stronger". Shooting of the film took place from September to November 1988 with a budget of three and a half million dollars.

On finding the appropriate church for the film, Argento stated they looked throughout Europe: Italy, France, Germany and Switzerland and found that nobody wanted them to shoot in their church due to the nature of the film. Finding it easier to shoot in Eastern Europe, the crew explored Czechoslovakia, Hungary and Bulgaria eventually settling on a Church in Hungary. The film was shot at Matthias Church in Budapest, in Hamburg, and at both R.P.A. Elios Studios and De Paolis In.Ci.R. studios in Rome. Soavi described his filming experience as exhausting, noting that he "was free, and I could do what I wanted... but I also sufferd a lot because of the difficulties, the vicissitudes, the delays".

While preparing for the film, Argento learned that Keith Emerson would be interested in writing the score, having worked with him previously on Inferno. He received his twelve-track demo which Argento did not like: "They were terrible. Not even a child would have written music like that. A sort of bombastic march, it sound like the Carabinieri fanfare". Only three tracks by Emerson were used in the film: an organ-driven main title theme, a track titled "Possession" and a rearranged version of Bach's Prelude 24. For the rest of the score, Soavi inserted two tracks by Philip Glass and relied on Fabio Pignatelli who is credited as Goblin.

Soavi has derisively referred to them as "Pizza Schlock", and expressed that he wanted The Church to be more sophisticated. In an interview with Cinefantastique, Soavi explained that he wished to move beyond with his creations following the film's release, and because of that he parted ways with Argento, ending their long-time creative partnership.

Release
The Church was distributed theatrically in Italy by Cecchi Gori in Italy on 10 March 1989. The film grossed a total of 1,926,277,000 Italian lire domestically. The film was the 36th top grossing film in Italy that year with Italian film historian and critic stating its gross diminished as the film rating board gave the film a F.M.18 certificate for "the many, particularly violent and shocking scenes which are considered unsuitable for the sensitivity of the spectators in developmental age". In comparison, the biggest film of the year in Italy was Roberto Benigni's Il piccolo diavolo which grossed 17 billion Italian lire. One year later, the film commission overturned the previous ruling and considered the films "violent and shocking scenes" as "...not particularly and intensely underlined within the general context of the film" and changed the rating to V.M.14.

The film was released in the United States on August 22, 1990 where it was distributed by TriStar Pictures.

Critical response
In a contemporary review, Variety referred to the film as a "technically proficient but empty horror exercise", praising the score by Goblin.

On review aggregator website Rotten Tomatoes, it holds an approval rating of 64% based on 11 reviews. Jason Buchanan of AllMovie gave the film a three star out of five rating, referring to it as a "gothic-drenched apocalyptic nightmare" that builds "a suffocating sense of quiet dread".

Footnotes

Sources

External links 
 
 
 

1989 films
1989 horror films
1980s supernatural horror films
Films directed by Michele Soavi
Films with screenplays by Dario Argento
Italian supernatural horror films
Gothic horror films
Religious horror films
Demons in film
Films set in religious buildings and structures
Films set in West Germany
Films set in Hamburg
Films shot in Budapest
Films shot in Rome
Films shot in Hamburg
Films scored by Philip Glass
Films scored by Keith Emerson
1980s Italian films